The 1941 Purdue Boilermakers football team was an American football team that represented Purdue University during the 1941 Big Ten Conference football season.  In their fifth season under head coach Allen Elward, the Boilermakers compiled a 2–5–1 record, finished in a tie for seventh place in the Big Ten Conference with a 1–3 record against conference opponents, and were outscored by their opponents by a total of 62 to 27.

Schedule

References

Purdue
Purdue Boilermakers football seasons
Purdue Boilermakers football